The Treaty of Uxbridge was a significant but abortive negotiation in early 1645 to try to end the First English Civil War.

Background
Parliament drew up 27 articles in November 1644 and presented them to Charles I of England at Oxford. Much input into these Propositions of Uxbridge was from Archibald Johnston. The conditions were very assertive, with Presbyterianism to be established south of the border, and Parliament to take control of all military matters.

Charles had decided that the military situation was turning in his favour, after the Second Battle of Lostwithiel, Second Battle of Newbury and consequent relief of Donnington Castle, and the campaign of James Graham, 1st Marquess of Montrose in Scotland. Montrose's victory at the Battle of Inverlochy was during the conference. His incentive to compromise was thereby reduced, but the same was true of the Parliamentary side, with its growing confidence in the New Model Army.

Proposals
Samuel Rawson Gardiner (1829–1902) summarized Parliament's demands (formatting added): exclusion from seats in the House of Lords of Peers created [after May 1642] unless with the consent of Parliament (§ 19)
 permanent submission of appointments of officers and judges to the approbation of Parliament (§ 20)
 education and marriage of the King's children being placed under Parliamentary control (§ 21)
 the right of declaring peace and war might only be exercised with the assent of Parliament (§ 23)
 a permanent body of Commissioners ... in combination with ... Scottish Commissioners to control all military forces in both kingdoms (§ 17)
 long lists ... of the names of those Royalists who were to be subjected to divers penalties [including execution for treason], and whole categories of unnamed persons were added, the [Parliamentary] expenses of the war being laid upon these Royalist delinquents (§ 14)
 religion in England ... to be brought to the nearest possible uniformity with that of Scotland (§ 5)
 the King himself was to swear and sign the Solemn League and Covenant (§ 2)
Such demands can only have been made with the object of trampling upon the King's feelings as well as upon his political authority, and it would have been far more reasonable to ask his consent to an act of abdication than to such articles as these.
Charles's counter-demands of January 21, 1645 (No. 62, p. 286), are conceived in a far more reasonable spirit:
 the Constitution should be accepted as it had stood at the end of August, 1641
 the Common Prayer Book should be preserved from 'scorn and violence,'
 a Bill should 'be framed for the ease of tender consciences.' [i.e., religious tolerance (for Protestants)]
The King's offer afforded at least an admirable basis for negotiation.

Proceedings
The two sides lodged in Uxbridge, the Royalists on the south side and the Parliamentarians in the north. Christopher Love preached a sermon, strongly against the Royalists, and he was rebuked by Parliament. The meetings were arranged in the house of Sir John Bennet.

The negotiations, which proved fruitless, went on from 29 January to 22 February. The King offered only to rein in the powers of the episcopate in religious matters, and to give Parliament some control of the militia, limited to a time period of three years.

Attendance

Royalists
John Ashburnham
Sir Orlando Bridgeman
Lord Arthur Capel
Lord John Colepeper
Sir Thomas Gardiner
Henry Hammond (chaplain)
Lord Christopher Hatton
Edward Hyde, Chancellor of the Exchequer
Richard Lane, Lord Chief Baron
Francis Leigh, Earl of Chichester
Edward Nicholas, Secretary of State
Jeoffry Palmer
Henry Pierrepont, Earl of Kingston
Lord Francis Seymour (brother of Hertford)
William Seymour, Marquess of Hertford
Gilbert Sheldon
James Stewart, Duke of Richmond (commission leader)
Dr. Richard Steward (religion only)
Thomas Wriothesley, Earl of Southampton

Parliamentarians
John Crew
Erasmus Earle (secretary)
Basil Feilding, Earl of Denbigh
Nathaniel Hardy
Philip Herbert, Earl of Pembroke
Denzil Holles
Stephen Marshall
Algernon Percy, Earl of Northumberland (commission leader)
William Pierrepont (brother of Kingston)
Edmund Prideaux
William Cecil, Earl of Salisbury
Oliver St John
John Thurloe (secretary)
Sir Henry Vane the Younger
Richard Vines
Lord Thomas Wenman
Bulstrode Whitelocke

Scottish
Robert Barclay
Lord John Bolmerino
Archibald Campbell, Marquess of Argile
John Campbell, Lord Chancellor of Scotland (commission leader)
Mr. Cheesly (secretary)
George Dundas
Charles Erskins
Alexander Henderson (religion only)
Sir Archibald Johnston
Hugh Kennedy
Lord John Maitland
Sir John Smith

See also
Crown and Treaty

Notes

External links
British Civil Wars page
The Uxbridge Treaty, 1645, BCW Project

Uxbridge
1645 treaties
1645 in England
Proposed treaties
History of the London Borough of Hillingdon
17th century in Middlesex
Uxbridge